Leigh Peta Sales  (born 10 May 1973) is an Australian journalist and author, best known for her work with the Australian Broadcasting Corporation.

Sales hosted ABC TV's current affairs program 7.30 from 2011 to 2022. In November 2022, it was announced that Sales had been appointed as the new host of ABC TV's weekly documentary series Australian Story.

Career
Sales was born in Brisbane and attended Aspley State High School in that city. She received a bachelor of journalism from the Queensland University of Technology and Master of International Relations from Deakin University. Sales joined the ABC in Brisbane in 1995.

Since then, Sales has held several prominent roles with the ABC and was New South Wales political reporter covering the 1999 and 2007 state elections. In addition, she reported on the 2000 Summer Olympics.

Sales was the network's Washington correspondent from 2001 to 2005. The stories which she covered included the Iraq War, the 2004 U.S. presidential election, Guantanamo Bay, and Hurricane Katrina.

Sales was the ABC's national security correspondent from 2006 until 2008 and was based in Sydney. From 2008 to 2010, Sales was a co-host of the ABC's Lateline, a late-night national current affairs show with a heavy emphasis on federal politics and international affairs.

Sales also hosted the ABC’s Australia Votes for the 2016 Australian Election and again for the 2019 election and hosted her last in 2022.

In December 2010, Sales was appointed anchor of the ABC's current affairs program, 7.30. She has interviewed every living Australian prime minister and many world leaders and celebrities, including Hillary Clinton, the Dalai Lama, Aung San Suu Kyi, Paul McCartney, Patti Smith, and Salman Rushdie.

In 2019, she was appointed a Member of the Order of Australia for her services to broadcast journalism.  

In February 2022, Sales announced she will step down from 7:30 in June 2022 following the federal election. She said she planned to continue working for the ABC. In November 2022 Sales was announced as the new host of ABC TV's weekly biographical documentary series Australian Story, to commence the role in early 2023.

Publishing career
Her first book, Detainee 002: The Case of David Hicks, was published in 2007 by Melbourne University Publishing (MUP). The book covers Hicks' case as well as a detailed explanation of the Bush administration's detainee policy in the War on Terror and the Australian government's cooperation.

Sales' second book, On Doubt, was published in 2009 as part of MUP's series Little Books on Big Themes. It covers the rise of opinion in place of straight news reporting and the value of bringing a sceptical mindset to politics and policy, instead of ideological certainty. A second edition was published in 2017, with an additional chapter noting the Trump presidency and the rise of fake news.

Her third book, Any Ordinary Day, was published in October 2018. It examines the way people adapt to life-changing blindsides, drawing on Sales' personal experience as well as her years covering high-profile news events that drastically changed people's lives.

Sales' writing has also regularly appeared in major Australian publications, including The Monthly, The Australian, The Sydney Morning Herald, The Age and, before its demise, The Bulletin.

In the wake of fellow ABC presenters Hamish Macdonald and Lisa Millar both deactivating their Twitter accounts due to the high level of personal abuse they received on the platform, Sales wrote an opinion piece for the ABC in September 2021 exploring the issue of bullying received by journalists on Twitter which she described as "insidious" and "unhinged".  This in turn prompted a public conversation on the topic.

Chat 10 Looks 3 podcast
In November 2014, Sales started a podcast with Annabel Crabb called Chat 10 Looks 3. It is independent of the work they do for other media outlets and is an opportunity for them to talk about books, movies, television, the media and culture. The podcast won two awards at the 2019 Australian Podcast Awards in the “Literature, Arts & Music” and “TV, Film & Pop Culture” categories. Described by Sales and Crabb as shambolic and peripatetic the podcast episodes are recorded every two to three weeks. The podcast has spawned livestream shows in Australian capital cities and a book titled Well Hello published in September 2021. Self-proclaimed “chatters or chatterati” have formed a Chat 10 Looks 3 community on social media platforms built around the same tenets as the podcast - friendship, kindness, and an agreement to not discuss politics. Sales has said “a community has sprung up around (the podcast) who shares these in-jokes and language and interests. When I consume podcasts …I tend to see myself as a member of the audience, not as a member of a community. That’s why it caught me by surprise”

Personal life
Sales was married to Phil Willis and they have two sons. After 20 years of marriage, Sales and Willis separated in December 2016.

Awards and recognition

Bibliography
 
On Doubt (2009)
 
Any Ordinary Day: Blindsided, Resilience, and What Happens After the Worst Day of Your Life (2018)

References

External links

Leigh Sales at The Punch
ABC Biography
Chat 10 Looks 3 podcast
Detainee 002: The Case of David Hicks at Melbourne University Publishing
"Book to tell torture tales when Hicks cannot" by Penelope Debelle, The Age (4 April 2007)
"2019 Queen's Birthday Honours List"
"Sales Best Seller"

1973 births
Living people
ABC News (Australia) presenters
Australian columnists
Australian television journalists
Deakin University alumni
The Monthly people
Members of the Order of Australia
People from Brisbane
Queensland University of Technology alumni
Walkley Award winners
Australian women columnists
Australian women television journalists
Australian political journalists